Music to Climb the Apple Tree By is a b-sides and rarities compilation by indie rock band Beat Happening.

Track listing
All tracks performed by Beat Happening.
 "Angel Gone" – 3:12
 "Nancy Sin" – 2:33
 "Sea Hunt" – 5:01
 "Look Around" – 2:57
 "Not A Care In The World" – 3:44
 "Dreamy" – 3:38
 "That Girl" – 1:57
 "Secret Picnic Spot" – 3:11
 "Zombie Limbo Time" – 4:04
 "Foggy Eyes" – 2:50
 "Knock On Any Door" – 3:28
 "Sea Babies" – 2:41
 "Tales Of Brave Aphrodite" – 2:56
 "Polly Pereguinn" – 4:25
 "I Dig You" – 1:58

References

Beat Happening albums
2003 compilation albums
B-side compilation albums
K Records compilation albums